"Since You've Been Gone" is a 2004 single from Powderfinger's fifth studio album Vulture Street. It was the fourth and final single released from Vulture Street and reached #51 on the Australian music chart. It was a limited edition single, hence no video or puzzle piece on the spine of the single. The song refers to Powderfinger's lead singer Bernard Fanning missing his brother who had died a year prior to the song's release.

Track listing

"Since You've Been Gone"
"Stop Sign" (Airlock demo)
"Another Day"

Charts

References

Powderfinger songs
2004 singles
2003 songs
Universal Records singles
Songs written by Jon Coghill
Songs written by John Collins (Australian musician)
Songs written by Bernard Fanning
Songs written by Ian Haug
Songs written by Darren Middleton